The 120th Division was a division deployed by the People's Republic of China.

History
The 120th Division was a military formation of the Chinese People's Liberation Army as part of the Chinese People's Volunteers (CPV) during the Korean War. It had a standard strength of approximately 10,000 men. It was a component of the 40th Army, and consisted of the 358th, 359th, and 360th Regiments.

References

Units and formations of the People's Armed Police